Jai Singh III (1818 – 1835), was the Maharaja of Jaipur inke son ramsingh 2nd the 1835_1880

Early life 
He was a son of Jagat Singh of Amber, Raja of Jaipur.

Maharaja Jagat Singh died under suspicious circumstances in November 1818 without any medical issues and hence Jaipur became heirless. Mohan Singh, from the Thikana of Narwar, was adopted in order to be enthroned. However, in April 1819, the Bhatiyani Queen of Jagat Singh gave birth to a son who was later named Jai Singh III and declared king.

Career

Jai Singh III spent the first 9 years of his life within the confines of the zenana, making his first public appearance in a procession to the Jamwa Mata Temple after the people of Jaipur demanded to see their ruler. The task of administration was entrusted to Rawal Berisal of Samode.  Constant troubles were created by Sanghi Jhutha Ram and Roopan Badaran, the former a suspect in the sudden death of Jagat Singh.  In 1812, Jaipur's first Political Agent, J. Stewart, moved into Maji ka Bagh, a garden that had been laid by Jai Singh II's queen. This came to be known as the Residency and is now the Raj Mahal Hotel.

Death

Jai Singh died on 6 February 1835 amidst a cloud of suspicion.  His body was found wrapped in a tent.  It was suspected that he was poisoned and murdered by Sanghi Jhutha Ram.

References 

Jai III
1819 births
1835 deaths